Capitan is an unincorporated community in Lafayette Parish, Louisiana, United States.

The community is located near the intersection of LA Hwy 89 and Platt Road.

References

Unincorporated communities in Louisiana
Unincorporated communities in Lafayette Parish, Louisiana
Acadiana